Tapgol Park, formerly Pagoda Park, is a small public park located at 99 Jong-ro (street), Jongno-gu, Seoul, South Korea. This park was once a site of Wongaksa (Buddhist Temple). The word tap means "pagoda", and the park gets its name from the Wongaksa Pagoda, a 10 storied stone pagoda (National Treasure No.2) located in the park.

It was previously the site of a 15th-century Buddhist temple, and a 10 storied stone pagoda and a few relics of the temple still can be seen in the park. It was organized as a garden and national park by John McLeavy Brown, the Irish  advisor to provincial subdivision in 1897.

One of the monuments in the park is the Monument of Wongaksa built in 1471 to record the founding of Wongaksa (temple) in 1465. On the front is an inscription composed by Kim Suon with the calligraphy done by Seong Im. On the back is found an inscription composed by Seo Geo Jeong with the calligraphy done by Jeong Nam Jong.  The turtle shaped base is constructed from granite and the body is cut from marble.  The monument measures 1.3 meters/4.3 feet wide and stands 4.9 meters/16.2 feet in height. Two elaborately carved intertwined dragons rising toward the sky holding a Buddhist gem reside on the top of the monument.  Monument of Wongaksa is Treasure #2.

Tapgol Park is historically important as the site of the origin of the March 1st Movement 1919, an important part of the Korean independence movement as the first location for the reading of the Proclamation of Independence. There are a number of bas-relief statues representing Korean patriots, the Proclamation of Independence Monument, and a poem by Han Yong-un.

As an important place in modern Korean history, it is a popular place for demonstrations of various types. It was the designated termination of the Grand Peace March for Democracy on June 24, 1986, that led to the acceptance of free elections by President Chun Doo-hwan of South Korea. It is served by Jongno 3-ga Station on Lines 1, 3 and 5 of the Seoul Subway.

Gallery

See also 

Seodaemun Independence Park
List of parks in Seoul

References
 
 

Jongno District
Parks in Seoul